Play It as It Lays is a 1970 novel by the American writer Joan Didion. Time magazine included the novel in its "100 Best English-Language Novels from 1923 to 2005". About the book, Joan Didion said, "I didn’t think it was going to make it [...] And suddenly it did make it, in a minor way. And from that time on I had more confidence."  The book was made into a 1972 movie starring Tuesday Weld as Maria and Anthony Perkins as BZ. Didion co-wrote the screenplay with her husband, John Gregory Dunne.

Plot introduction
The novel begins with an internal monologue by the 31-year-old Maria Wyeth, followed by short reminiscences of her friend Helene, and ex-husband, film producer Carter Lang. The further narration is conducted from a third-person perspective in eighty-four chapters of terse, controlled and highly visual prose typical of Didion.

Plot
Maria's story begins as she is recovering from a mental breakdown in a psychiatric hospital in the Los Angeles area, but soon flashes back to her life before the hospital. A not-quite lurid view of life in Hollywood follows. Didion's late 1960s Los Angeles is a mix of grimness and glamour. Maria's journey oscillates between dizzying and domestic, as her acting career slows and her personal life collapses.

Maria contrasts her life in Los Angeles with her childhood in Silver Wells, Nevada, a small town so inconsequential that it no longer exists. The daughter of a neurotic mother and a gambling father and who bet on a mine and lost, Maria moved to New York to become an actress. In New York, Maria works temporarily as a model and meets Ivan Costello, a psychopathic blackmailer who has no hesitation exploiting Maria for her money or her body.

In New York, Maria receives news of her mother's death in a car wreck, possibly a suicide. Her father dies soon after, leaving useless mineral rights to his business partner and friend Benny Austin. Maria withdraws from acting and modeling, splits up with Ivan, and eventually meets Carter and moves to Hollywood. Later, we find that she and Carter have a four-year-old daughter Kate, who is under mental and physical "treatment" for some "aberrant chemical in her brain". Maria truly loves Kate, as indicated by her tender descriptions, her frequent hospital visits, and her determination "to get her out".

An inevitable divorce, and the ensuing social chaos bring Maria to indulge in self-destructive behavior. She plunges into long nights of compulsive driving, wandering Southern California's freeways, through motels and bars, drinking and chancing sexual encounters with actors and ex-lovers. After a series of disasters for Maria, infidelity among her friends adds further chaos to her life. Her friend BZ commits suicide and Maria is institutionalized. From her hospital, Maria turns her visitors away, and plans for a day she might see her daughter again.

References

External Links 

 Book page on the official website

1970 American novels
American novels adapted into films
Novels set in California
Novels by Joan Didion
Novels about actors
Hollywood novels